Kar Gazi (also Romanized as Kār Gazī; also known as Par Gazī and Por Gazī) is a village in Mosaferabad Rural District, Rudkhaneh District, Rudan County, Hormozgan Province, Iran. At the 2006 census, its population was 127, in 29 families.

References 

Populated places in Rudan County